Gary Stephen Birch (born 8 October 1981) is an English former football player and manager who played as a striker. He was most recently the manager at Walsall Wood.

Playing career
Birch scored on his AFC Telford debut in the 4–3 victory against Mossley at Seel Park. Birch came on as a substitute before scoring the winning goal. Struggling with his weight, in September 2007, he was loaned to Rushall Olympic in an attempt to gain match fitness. Birch left the club at the end of the 2007–08 season to join Chasetown.

Birch netted his 50th Chasetown goal in all competitions in a 1–1 home draw with Chorley on 27 August 2011. He departed from the club in June 2012, and signed for Solihull Moors.

Management career
In October 2014 he was appointed manager of Lichfield City, departing in May 2016 after feeling that he had taken the club as far as he could. In November 2016 he joined Hednesford Town as assistant manager to Paul Casey. In February 2017, Casey resigned his role and Birch and fellow assistant Gavin Hurren were placed in temporary charge of first team affairs. On 15 March 2017, Birch was appointed permanent manager of the club.

Birch quit as Hednesford manager to accept a job offer from Walsall Wood on 6 May 2017.

References

External links

 
 

Living people
1981 births
Association football forwards
English footballers
Walsall F.C. players
Exeter City F.C. players
Nuneaton Borough F.C. players
Barnsley F.C. players
Kidderminster Harriers F.C. players
Lincoln City F.C. players
Tamworth F.C. players
Hucknall Town F.C. players
AFC Telford United players
Rushall Olympic F.C. players
Chasetown F.C. players
Solihull Moors F.C. players
English Football League players
National League (English football) players
Northern Premier League players
English football managers
Highgate United F.C. managers
Lichfield City F.C. managers
Hednesford Town F.C. managers
Walsall Wood F.C. managers